José Batista Leite da Silva or simply Batista (born 12 July 1979 in Anguera, Bahia), is a Brazilian footballer. He currently plays for Operário Ferroviário.

Honours

Palmeiras Nordeste

 Bahia State League: 2002

References

External links
 Futpédia
 CBF

1979 births
Living people
Sportspeople from Bahia
Brazilian footballers
Association football midfielders
Adap Galo Maringá Football Club players
Mogi Mirim Esporte Clube players
Paraná Clube players
Avaí FC players
Botafogo de Futebol e Regatas players